Jelly Jamm is a 3D animated children's television series created by Carlos L. del Rey, Víctor M. López and David Cantolla. The series is a production of Vodka Capital and 737 SHAKER, two Spanish producers based in Madrid and Segovia, respectively, and is co-produced with RTVE, Japanese toy, action figure and video game company Bandai, and home entertainment distributor Big Picture. It first aired internationally on Cartoonito and also aired on Milkshake!, a children's programming block made by Channel 5 in the UK, as well as airing on Spanish children's television channel Clan.

The intention of Jelly Jamm is to "celebrate music, fun and friendship," and in each episode, the characters interact with each other in various games and activities, learning morals and lessons. The show is aimed at kids 4 to 9 years old.

On May 15, 2019, Canadian company Blue Ant Media acquired the distribution rights to the series from Vodka Capital.

Premise 
Jelly Jamm takes place on a fictional, colourful planet called Jammbo, following the adventures of seven characters: Bello, Goomo, Rita, Mina, Ongo, the King, and the Queen, who live in a small neighbourhood there. The planet has a music factory where all of the music in the universe originates from and is produced continuously through bubbles. If the music produced by the factory had stopped, time on Jammbo would also stop, causing the characters to freeze. Each episode features a plot in which a character or multiple characters learn a teachable lesson which the viewers can learn from, and features an insert song which may be instrumental or vocal.

Episodes

Characters 
Jelly Jamm mostly consists of a small cast of characters, mainly featuring the five main child characters and the King and Queen, who are the only major adult characters in the series. They are all residents of the planet Jammbo (Jammbonians).

Main 
 Bello (voiced by Lizzie Waterworth) is a red male Jammbonian who acts as the leader of the group and is described to have "an insatiable curiosity and boundless energy" and "a driving force among his friends", who he keeps close to; in particular, Goomo, his best friend and sidekick (as he considers). Bello enjoys reading comics, particularly his own comic that he draws called "Jammboman". In addition to drawing, Bello enjoys dancing. His personality, combined with his extensive general knowledge, helps him be highly involved in the show's various adventures.
 Goomo (voiced by Maria Darling) is a magenta male Jammbonian who is sensitive, quiet, and friendly. Goomo always seeks a quick solution in any conflict to make everyone happy again. His solutions are often based only on feelings, making things either out of control or completely resolved. Goomo is a cheerful child who expresses himself freely through his dance skills. Goomo is a little chubby and sometimes has a big appetite, however he has shown an interest in exercise. Goomo loves his best friend Bello and they love to play together, especially when Bello makes Goomo Sidekickman, Jammboman's assistant. Goomo usually wears a helmet to hide his tousled hair, however he has never been seen without it except in silhouette.
 Mina (voiced by Emma Weaver) is a blue female Jammbonian whose role is to be the brainiest of the group. Mina speaks with an unknown foreign accent, which vanishes gradually in the second season since the episode Dodo Butterfly, and spends time experimenting and making inventions at home as a scientific and curious character. These inventions, combined with her knowledge, frequently help the group, so Mina is a source of help when the others face adversity in their adventures. Mini Mina is a miniature robot likeness of Mina that appears in "Mina's Swing", "Goomo's Birthday", and "Look at Me!", however her first cameo was in "Mina's Party" prior to her proper introduction.
 Rita (voiced by Isabella Blake-Thomas) is a cute, pink female Jammbonian who is tender, sweet, affectionate, and playful. Rita is small and polite and enjoys playing dress-up with Princess, who is a stuffed ragdoll and her best friend. Rita is sometimes impulsive, leading her to ignore the potential dangers of Jammbo. Rita loves petting Dodos, but sometimes she does it with too much emotion, making them flee. Luckily, the Dodos run faster than her. Rita loves tea parties, especially with Princess. Rita's favourite people are the Queen and Bello (who she considers her hero), who she wants to be like someday. Rita usually considers Princess as more of her younger sister who has a more simpler wrist, due to her being smaller than Rita herself, and appears to be the youngest of the group.
 Ongo is a purple male Jammbonian who rarely speaks and instead communicates through sounds, dance, and music. Being very quiet, Ongo is depicted as highly mysterious, but still expressive. Ongo is the most skilled musician among the characters. Ongo lives in a "house" that he created, mainly consisting of a couch placed among a floorplan of rooms traced in chalk on the ground, without any walls or ceilings.
 The King (voiced by Adam Longworth) is a purple Jammbonian king who wears purple clothing and is educated and wise when speaking in public, but in private, he is more childish and mischievous. The King loves being the king and decrees things at random. The King spends most of his time doing "King Business", but what the King likes most is to play video games or look at his amazing collection of toys and objects stored in his gift-vault.
 The Queen (voiced by Beth Chalmers) is a purple Jammbonian queen who wears yellow clothing, works while the King is busy playing, organises the work of the Dodos (who adore her), and directs the Music Factory to keep running. The Queen loves working in her garden, knitting, and playing castanets. In addition to all of this, the Queen slightly shakes her hips. The Queen has a strong moral sense and therefore is a great guide for children, though she may not always know how to respond to people's questions. According to the King, the Queen was the naughtiest girl of all when she was a child. The "La-La Plants" are one favourite of the Queen (without counting her musical bamboo) that appeared in the episodes "The Instant Gardener", "Silent Sheriff", and "Tree Mystery".

Secondary 
 The Dodos are a genus of horn-shaped creatures who are described as "the most amazing Jammbo beings". The Dodos have black bodies, brightly coloured green faces and a hooked tail. The Dodos live on the land, the air and water. They, similar to real mammals, are easily frightened and often flee in groups. Most of them work in the Music Factory, creating the music in the kingdom. The Dodos love music and keep up with it by whistling or singing the chorus. Their most important task is to keep the Music Factory running. From the second season on, the Dodos' colours get more varied. There are also Giant Dodos that have blue bodies and light-yellow faces and are always asleep and only wake up if someone bothers them. The Dodos are often born green, but change colour if they are of another species (such as blue Sky Dodos that have wings).
 Cheating Bracelets are evil bracelets belonging to the King and Queen. They usually convince people to use them, but whoever uses them will see them with traps. They win each time, however they may never release their user in theory. Each Cheating Bracelet can speak and have great powers. One of them managed to convince Rita to use it, but then she discovered her mistake too late. Fortunately, Bello found a way to remove the bracelet from Rita and incidentally gave a good lesson to the Cheating Bracelets so that they do not trap once again.
 Jammbobot is a robot that appears in "Inventor Bello" and in other episodes. Bello remodelled it. Unfortunately for Bello, the machine had some defects and Mina arrived to stop the robot later. Bello then apologised to Mina and both made further improvements to the robot.
 Fred is a basketball and a dancer who wears tap dancing shoes and is male. Fred appears in the episodes "Cheating Bracelets", "Haunted Castle", "Goomo's Birthday", "Flying Bathtub", "Dodo Butterfly", "Double Bello", "The Fall of Jammboman", and the music video "You Are Great" as one of the guests at Rita's birthday party.
 The Sun is a bright yellow character that only appears in the music video "Jump Now!". The Sun serves as a personification of the sun and wakes up the main cast every morning.
 The Taunting Skull is a giant skull that loves to taunt adventurers seeking treasures with challenges that test their value. The Taunting Skull only appears in the episode "One-Eyed Bello".
 Dodo Dancer is a forest-living dodo that loves music like every creature in Jammbo, but is noted among other dodos for its red, unique dancing suit and its dances. Dodo Dancer likes many musical genres (such as rap) and its favourite dance is the breakdance (without counting its robot dance). Dodo Dancer appears in the episodes "Inventor Bello", "Flying Bathtub", "Back-Up", and the music video "You Are Great" as one of the guests at Rita's birthday party.
 Grandpa Dodo, also known as Dodo Sensei, is a male and senile dodo that is thousands of years old, is purple, has a moustache, and has white hair. Grandpa Dodo uses a small wooden stick to walk, but above all, he is very wise, as it is said that he is the wisest dodo. Grandpa Dodo nursed Bello since his birth (because he has many photos of Bello) and is a grandfather to him. Grandpa Dodo knows that Bello can be reckless and impatient, but despite this, he is very proud of him, because he knows he has a big heart, and despite the difficulties, always makes the right decisions. Grandpa Dodo appears in the episodes "Grandpa Dodo", "A Day at the Races", "The Assistant Grandpa", "The Plant", "Repetition, Repetition", "Choose Me", "My Turn", and "Holding Hands".

Songs 
Jelly Jamm is known for its music and songs, either at the beginning, middle, or end of each episode, which are also popularly known as "Jelly Songs" or "Jelly Sounds" in the UK. Below are the original names of the songs.

 Let's Go Together!
 Jump Now!
 You Are Great
 Holding Hands (Holding Hands Around The World)
 It's a Beautiful World
 Don't Be Afraid
 I Love You (You're My Friend)
 Just Do It!
 Together We're a Team
 You'd Better Smile
 Don't Get Angry
 We Did It!
 So Long

Songs in special topics 
This is a list of other songs that can also be heard during the show and each episode. These include:

 Flying Bathtub Rap
 Our Favourite Superheroes
 Play Time
 Surfing Jammbo
 Mina's Lessons
 Moving Time
 Jammboman
 White Dodo
 This is Jelly Jamm!
 Go!
 Jammbobot
 Fantastic
 Half Day
 Charleston
 Dodos' Theme

Soundtrack 
A Jelly Jamm soundtrack was released, featuring various famous songs from the hit series as a physical album with all songs in Castilian Spanish for the Spain market, in Latin American Spanish for the Latin American market and online in English, European Portuguese, and French (via Jelly Jamm's YouTube channels).

Development and broadcast 
The series' production was first announced in March 2009, when Vodka Capital signed co-production deals with RTVE and Bandai.

Jelly Jamm has been broadcast on TV stations in more than 150 countries, notably Boomerang (as part of the Cartoonito preschool block), Discovery Kids, and ZooMoo. The series is available in 23 languages in Europe, the Americas, Asia, Oceania, the Middle East, and Africa.

The series is also available in its entirety, officially uploaded to YouTube to stream for free. Several streaming services such as Amazon Prime Video and Kidoodle TV also house the series.

References

External links
 

2010s British children's television series
2010s British animated television series
2011 British television series debuts
2013 British television series endings
British children's animated adventure television series
British children's animated comedy television series
British children's animated education television series
British children's animated musical television series
British computer-animated television series
Cartoonito original programming
Channel 5 (British TV channel) original programming
Animated television series about extraterrestrial life
Animated television series about children
RTVE shows
English-language television shows